Eureka Municipal Airport  is a city-owned, public-use airport located two nautical miles (4 km) north of the central business district of Eureka, a city in McPherson County, South Dakota, United States. It is included in the National Plan of Integrated Airport Systems for 2011–2015, which categorized it as a general aviation facility.

Facilities and aircraft 
Eureka Municipal Airport covers an area of 183 acres (74 ha) at an elevation of 1,935 feet (590 m) above mean sea level. It has two runways: 12/30 is 3,100 by 60 feet (945 x 18 m) with an asphalt surface and 7/25 is 2,100 by 150 feet (640 x 46 m) with a turf surface. For the 12-month period ending September 12, 2011, the airport had 336 general aviation aircraft operations, an average of 28 per month.

References

External links 
 Eureka (3W8) at SDDOT Airport Directory
 Aerial image as of October 1997 from USGS The National Map
 

Airports in South Dakota
Buildings and structures in McPherson County, South Dakota
Transportation in McPherson County, South Dakota